Soul Survivor is the debut studio album of hip hop producer and emcee Pete Rock, formerly of the acclaimed duo Pete Rock & CL Smooth. Rock contributes to all the production on the release, as well as a number of verses, while leaving a large part of the rhyming to several guest artists; such as, Kurupt of Tha Dogg Pound, Wu-Tang Clan members Raekwon, Inspectah Deck, Ghostface Killah, Method Man, & Cappadonna, O.C., Black Thought of The Roots, Rob-O, formerly of the group InI, Prodigy of Mobb Deep, Lord Tariq & Peter Gunz, Large Professor, Kool G Rap, MC Eiht, Jane Eugene & Loose Ends, Vinia Mojica, Miss Jones, Heavy D, Beenie Man, Sticky Fingaz of Onyx, Common, Big Punisher, Noreaga, and former partner C.L. Smooth.

Track listing 
All tracks produced by Pete Rock, except track 3 produced by Grap Luva

Documentary
A documentary was released around the time of the album, which featured the recording sessions of some of the tracks.

Singles

Chart positions

Album

Singles

References

External links
 Soul Survivor Documentary
 

1998 debut albums
Pete Rock albums
Loud Records albums
Albums produced by Pete Rock